Great Work is a hamlet near the village of Godolphin Cross and located several miles west of the town of Helston, in the south-west of the county of Cornwall, England. It is home to the Great Work Mine.

References

Hamlets in Cornwall